Norway competed at the 1968 Winter Olympics in Grenoble, France.

Medalists

Alpine skiing

Men

Men's slalom

Women

Biathlon

Men

 1 One minute added per close miss (a hit in the outer ring), two minutes added per complete miss.

Men's 4 x 7.5 km relay

 2 A penalty loop of 200 metres had to be skied per missed target.

Cross-country skiing

Men

Men's 4 × 10 km relay

Women

Women's 3 x 5 km relay

Ice hockey

First round
 East Germany -   Norway 3:1 (2:1, 1:0, 0:0) 
Goalscorers: Joachim Ziesche, Lothar Fuchs, Peter Prusa - Odd Syversen.

Consolation round 
Teams in this group play for 9th-14th places.

  Norway –  France 4:1 (1:1, 2:0, 1:0)
Goalscorers: Hagensen, Smefjell, Dalsören, Mikkelsen – Liberman.

 Japan –   Norway  4:0 (2:0, 2:0, 0:0)
Goalscorers: Okajima 2, Ebina, Araki.

  Norway –  Austria 5:4 (3:1, 2:1, 0:2)
Goalscorers: Dalsören 2, Bjölbak, Olsen, Hansen – Schupp 2, Weingärtner, St. John.

  Norway –  Romania 4:3 (2:2, 1:1, 1:0)
Goalscorers: Bergeid, Olsen, Syversen, Mikkelsen – Pana, Iuliu Szabo, Czaka.

 Yugoslavia –   Norway 3:2 (1:1, 0:0, 2:1)
Goalscorers: Hiti, Franz Smolej, Ivo Jan - Dalsören, Bjölbak.

Contestants
Team Roster
Kåre Østensen
Svein Hansen
Thor Martinsen
Terje Steen
Odd Syversen
Tor Gundersen
Christian Petersen
Per Skjerwen Olsen
Georg Smefjell
Olav Dalsøren
Arne Mikkelsen
Steinar Bjølbakk
Svein Haagensen
Terje Thoen
Bjørn Johansen
Rodney Riise
Trygve Bergeid

Luge

Men

Nordic combined 

Events:
 normal hill ski jumping 
 15 km cross-country skiing

Ski jumping

Speed skating

Men

Women

References
 Official Olympic Reports
 International Olympic Committee results database
 Olympic Winter Games 1968, full results by sports-reference.com

Nations at the 1968 Winter Olympics
1968
1968 in Norwegian sport